The U20 Barthés Trophy is an annual rugby union competition that features national Under-20 teams from Africa, organised by Rugby Africa. The tournament began in 2007 with Uganda as the host, which saw Namibia winning the title.

The tournament champion qualifies to the next year's World Rugby Junior Championship organised by the World Rugby.

History 
The 2020 tournament was postponed due to the COVID-19 pandemic.

Tournament placings

U20 Barthés Trophy

Previous Tournaments 
Division A

Division B

References

External links
 Official site

 
Under
2007 establishments in Africa